Muscle Beach Party is the second of seven beach party films produced by American International Pictures. It stars Frankie Avalon and Annette Funicello and was directed by William Asher, who also directed four other films in this series.

Dick Dale and the Del-Tones and Stevie Wonder appear in musical numbers, the latter aged thirteen and making his film debut, billed as "Little Stevie Wonder."

The movie was released two days after Peter Lorre's death.

Plot
Frankie, Dee Dee, and the beach party gang hit Malibu Beach for yet another summer of surfing and no jobs, only to find their secret surfing spot threatened by a gang of bodybuilders led by the dim-witted coach Jack Fanny. All the while a bored Italian countess is trying to steal Frankie from Dee Dee and, much to everyone's surprise, he seems more than happy to go along with it. Her plan is to turn him into a teen idol.

Due to some razzing from his former surfing buddies and sage advice from wealthy S.Z. Matts, Frankie sees the error of his ways and goes back to his American beach bunny, Dee Dee.

Cast
Frankie Avalon as Frankie
Annette Funicello as Dee Dee
Luciana Paluzzi as Contessa Juliana ("Julie") Giotto-Borgini 
John Ashley as Johnny
Don Rickles as Jack Fanny
Peter Turgeon as Theodore
Jody McCrea as Deadhead
Dick Dale as Himself
Candy Johnson	   .... 	Candy
Rock Stevens (Peter Lupus)	   .... 	Flex Martian
Valora Noland	   .... 	Animal
Delores Wells	   .... 	Sniffles
Donna Loren	   .... 	Donna
Morey Amsterdam	   .... 	Cappy
Little Stevie Wonder      .... 	Himself
Buddy Hackett	   .... 	S.Z. Matts (rich business manager)
Dan Haggerty  .... 	Biff
Larry Scott	   .... 	Rock
Gordon Case	   .... 	Tug
Gene Shuey	   .... 	Riff
Chester Yorton	   .... 	Hulk
Bob Seven	   .... 	Sulk
Steve Merjanian	   .... 	Clod
Alberta Nelson	   .... 	Lisa, Jack Fanny's assistant
Amadee Chabot	   .... 	Flo, Jack Fanny's assistant
Peter Lorre	   .... 	Mr. Strangdour

Cast notes
Funicello reprises her character from Beach Party, although in this film (and three others that follow) she is referred to as "Dee Dee", as opposed to "Dolores."  John Ashley's character, previously called "Ken", is now known as "Johnny."

Harvey Lembeck's Eric von Zipper character and his Rats gang from Beach Party are absent in this film, although they appear in Bikini Beach, Pajama Party, Beach Blanket Bingo, How to Stuff a Wild Bikini, and The Ghost in the Invisible Bikini. Lembeck as von Zipper (but sans Rats gang) also appears in a cameo in Dr. Goldfoot and the Bikini Machine. Lembeck also appeared in Fireball 500, another Avalon-Funicello vehicle, as an entirely different character. Peter Lorre appears briefly near the end of the film and there is a notice explaining that he will appear in the next installment of the series. Lorre died in March 1964; thus, this was his only appearance in the series.

Production notes
Before production producer Martin Ransohoff announced he was going to make a film called Muscle Beach based on Ira Wallach's satirical novel. This was eventually made as Don't Make Waves (1967).

Novelization

A 141-page paperback adaptation of the screenplay, written by Elsie Lee, was published prior to the release of the film by Lancer Books.

Jack Fanny's bodybuilders

In the above-cited paperback adaptation, the Jack Fanny character introduces his bodybuilders as Biff, Rock, Tug, Riff, Sulk, Mash and Clod, whereas in the film he calls them Biff, Rock, Tug, Riff, Sulk, Hulk, and Clod.  In two separate sequences, the latter version of these names is seen printed on their shirts.

Larry Scott, who played Rock, was well known in the bodybuilding world at the time and became the first Mr. Olympia. Due to his preference for a piece of gym equipment commonly known as the Preacher Bench, the bench also became known as the Scott Curl Bench. Gene Shuey who played Riff, and Chester Yorton who played Hulk, were also well known in the bodybuilding circuit. Peter Lupus (aka "Rock Stevens") was also a champion bodybuilder himself, holding the titles of Mr. Indianapolis, Mr. Indiana, Mr. Hercules, and Mr. International Health Physique. He is best known as Willy Armitage, the strong, mostly silent, member of the IMF team in Mission: Impossible from 1966 to 1973.

Costumes and props

The swimsuits were designed by Rose Marie Reid; Buddy Hackett's clothes were from Mr. Guy of Los Angeles; and the hat that Deadhead wears was designed by Ed "Big Daddy" Roth.

The surfboards used in the film were by Phil of Downey, California – aka Phil Sauers, the maker of "Surfboards of the Stars." Sauers was also the stunt coordinator for another beach party film that used his surfboards, Columbia Pictures' Ride the Wild Surf, which was released later the same year. Sauers was even portrayed in that film as a character by Mark LaBuse.

The "globe" telephone cover on Mr. Strangdour's desk is the same one in Norma Desmond's home in the film Sunset Blvd.

Music
The original score for this film, like Beach Party before it, was composed by Les Baxter.

Roger Christian, Gary Usher and Brian Wilson (of The Beach Boys) wrote six songs for the film: 
"Surfer's Holiday" performed by Frankie Avalon, Annette Funicello and the cast; 
"Runnin' Wild" performed by Frankie Avalon; 
"My First Love" and "Muscle Beach Party," both performed by Dick Dale and His Del-Tones; 
"Muscle Bustle" performed by Donna Loren with Dick Dale and His Del-Tones; and 
"Surfin' Woodie" performed a cappella by Dick Dale with the cast.

Guy Hemric and Jerry Styner wrote two songs for the film: 
"Happy Street" performed by Little Stevie Wonder; and 
"A Girl Needs a Boy" first performed by Annette Funicello, then reprised by Frankie Avalon as "A Boy Needs a Girl."

Opening title art
The colorful, hand-painted mural that is shown in full and in detail as background during the opening credits is by California artist Michael Dormer, whose surfer cartoon character, "Hot Curl" can also be glimpsed throughout the film.

Deleted scene
Although the end titles provide a credit reading, "Muscle Mao Mao Dance Sequence Choreographed by John Monte, National Dance Director, Fred Astaire Studios", no such sequence is found in the film's release prints.

Reception
John L. Scott of the Los Angeles Times called it "a romantic, slightly satirical film comedy with songs which should prove popular with members of the two younger sets it concerns — surfers and musclemen — and with oldsters who don't mind the juvenile antics." Variety wrote that "the novelty of surfing has worn off, leaving in its wake little more than a conventional teenage-geared romantic farce with songs ... Whenever the story bogs down, which it does quite often, someone runs into camera range and yells, 'surf's up!' This is followed by a series of cuts of surfers in action. It's all very mechanical." The Monthly Film Bulletin stated, "Indifferently scripted, and lacking the brightening presence of Dorothy Malone and Bob Cummings, this is an excruciatingly unfunny and unattractive sequel to Beach Party. William Asher's direction remains quite bright, but that is about all that can be said for the film."

The Golden Laurel, which had no ceremony but published its award results in the trade magazine Motion Picture Exhibitor from 1958 to 1971, nominated Annette Funicello for "Best Female Musical Performance" for this film in 1965.

The film was banned in Burma, along with Ski Party, Bikini Beach and Beach Blanket Bingo.

Cultural references
 Don Rickles' character name "Jack Fanny" is based on then-popular bodybuilder and gym entrepreneur (and usually sharp-dressed) Vic Tanny. The forename "Jack" might also be a reference to another then-popular fitness instructor, bodybuilder, and gym-entrepreneur, Jack LaLanne.
 Julie's remark to an angry Dee Dee, "Have you tried Miltown?" is in reference to the drug Miltown by Wallace Laboratories, a carbamate derivative used as an anxiolytic drug – it was the best-selling minor tranquilizer at the time.
 Cappy's Place in this film (and Big Daddy's club in the preceding Beach Party) is a reference to Southern California beach coffeehouses in general and Cafe Frankenstein in particular.
 This is the second and last time Avalon or any other "teenager" in the cast smokes cigarettes onscreen in the series – the Surgeon General's report on smoking was released on January 11, 1964, while Muscle Beach Party was being filmed.

See also
List of American films of 1964

References

External links
 
 
 
 Muscle Beach Party at Brian's Drive In Theatre
 Muscle Beach Party at Music of the Beach Party Movies

1964 films
1964 comedy films
1960s teen comedy films
American International Pictures films
American sequel films
American teen comedy films
Beach party films
Censored films
Films directed by William Asher
Films scored by Les Baxter
Films set in Malibu, California
Teensploitation
1960s English-language films
1960s American films